1st Yanaul (1-se Yañawıl) is a rural locality (a village) in Kudashevsky Selsoviet of Tatyshlinsky District, Russia. The population was 98 as of 2010.

Geography 
1st Yanaul is located 18 km west of Verkhniye Tatyshly (the district's administrative centre) by road. Kardagushevo is the nearest rural locality.

Streets 
 Zarechnaya
 Faiza Galieva
 Tsentralnaya

References

External links 
 1st Yanaul on travellers.ru
 Council of Municipalities of the Republic of Bashkortostan

Rural localities in Tatyshlinsky District